John Bryan State Park, in Greene County, Ohio, is a state park, of . It surrounds Clifton Gorge, a deep cut of the Little Miami River, between Yellow Springs and Clifton. The park contains a campground, and hiking and biking trails. The park also abuts the Clifton Gorge State Nature Preserve and Glen Helen Nature Preserve.

History 
The Cincinnati–Pittsburgh stagecoach road served the area, and several settlers established water-powered industries in the gorge. The town of Clifton prospered from the textile mill, grist mills, and sawmills there.

By the late 19th century, most of the industrial activity in the area had ceased. Water was no longer an economical source of power, and many mills were abandoned. However, one of the grist mills, built in 1802, is still in operation: the Clifton Mill, in the village of Clifton, is open to visitors.

In 1896, John Bryan, a businessman, purchased  along the Clifton Gorge area and called the land "Riverside Farm". This part of the Little Miami River was a vital, economical source of power for the early settlers in the 19th century. In 1918, he bequeathed Riverside Farm to the state of Ohio, "to be cultivated by the state as a forestry, botanic and wildlife reserve park and experiment station", which would bear his name. In May 1925, John Bryan's land became one of the state's first forest parks. In 1949, John Bryan State Park was transferred to the newly created Division of Parks and Recreation, part of the Ohio Department of Natural Resources. John Bryan State Park and the adjoining Clifton Gorge State Nature Preserve overlook the Little Miami River gorge, which the United States Department of the Interior designated a National Natural Landmark.

References

External links

John Bryan State Park Ohio Department of Natural Resources
John Bryan State Park Map Ohio Department of Natural Resources

State parks of Ohio
Protected areas of Greene County, Ohio
Protected areas established in 1949
1949 establishments in Ohio